Dictyonema tricolor is a species of basidiolichen in the family Hygrophoraceae. It is found in Tanzania, where it grows as an epiphyte on trees. The lichen was formally described as a new species by lichenologists Robert Lücking and Einar Timdal. The species epithet refers to the three-colours displayed where the regularly ascending tufts of blue-green cyanobacterial fibrils meet the brown or white colour in the  part of the tufts.

Dictyonema tricolor is a member of the Dictyonema sericeum species complex, a group of species sharing similar overall morphology, including shelf-like, filamentous lobes.

References

Hygrophoraceae
Basidiolichens
Lichen species
Lichens described in 2016
Lichens of Mauritius
Taxa named by Robert Lücking
Taxa named by Einar Timdal